Thinophilus ruficornis is a species of fly in the family Dolichopodidae. It is found in the  Palearctic .

References

External links
Images representing Thinophilus ruficornis at BOLD

Hydrophorinae
Insects described in 1838
Diptera of Europe
Taxa named by Alexander Henry Haliday